The Pastoral – Not Rustic – World of Their Greatest Hits is the debut album by Country Teasers. The compact disc release adds "Anytime, Cowboy" and "No.1 Man" from the Crypt single, which was recorded in Edinburgh, Scotland in 1993.

Track listing 
All songs written by B.R. Wallers except where noted

Side one
"How I Found Black-Brodie" – 1:34
"Only My Saviour" – 2:48
"Bitches' Fuck-Off" – 1:46
"O, Nurse!" – 1:12
"Anytime, Cowboy #2" – 2:23

Side two
"Mosquito" – 2:35
"Drove a Truck" – 2:17
"Been Too Long" – 3:01
"Black Cloud Wandering" (Lerner and Loewe) – 3:48
"Stand by Your Man" (Billy Sherrill/Tammy Wynette) – 2:23

CD version
"How I Found Black-Brodie" – 1:34
"Only My Saviour" – 2:48
"Bitches' Fuck-Off" – 1:46
"O, Nurse!" – 1:12
"Anytime, Cowboy #2" – 2:23
"Mosquito" – 2:35 
"Drove a Truck" – 2:17  
"Been Too Long" – 3:01
"Black Cloud Wandering" – 3:48  
"Stand By Your Man" – 2:23
"Anytime, Cowboy" – 2:01  
"Number 1 Man" – 2:32

Personnel
B. R. Wallers - Singing, Guitar & Drums
Alan. K. Crichton - Guitars
Simon W. Stephens - Bass
George Miller - Drums (on "Anytime, Cowboy" and "No.1 Man")

References

1995 debut albums
Country Teasers albums
Crypt Records albums